Álvaro Martín is a Puerto Rican commentator who used to work for ESPN Deportes. He currently works for the NBA League Pass service, where he provides play-by-play usually accompanied by former basketball coach Carlos Morales, who has worked with him since he was at ESPN.

After graduating from Colegio San Ignacio de Loyola in Puerto Rico, Martín received an undergraduate degree from Harvard University, and graduated with an MS in business administration from Harvard Business School.

He began work in 1991 at ESPN. His commentary duties include the NFL and NBA.

He provided voice commentary in the Spanish-language versions of the video games Madden NFL 08 and Madden NFL 09.

References

Year of birth missing (living people)
Living people
American television sports announcers
ESPN Latin America
Harvard Business School alumni
Harvard University alumni
Major League Baseball broadcasters
National Basketball Association broadcasters
National Football League announcers
Puerto Rican journalists